Hrudaya Pallavi is a 1987 Indian Kannada-language film,  directed by  R. N. Jayagopal and produced by Kurunji Shivaram and Smt Jaya Shivaram. The film stars Srinath, Geetha, Ramakrishna and Pavithra. The film has musical score by M. Ranga Rao. The film was a remake of Tamil film Kaalangalil Aval Vasantham.

Cast

Srinath
Geetha
Ramakrishna
Pavithra
Charanraj in Guest Appearance
R. N. Sudarshan in Guest Appearance
Dinesh
Brahmavar
Bangalore Nagesh
Jayagopal
Sathyabhama
Manjula Subbanna
Shanthi
Baby Usha
K. S. Sathyanarayana
Jackie Shivakumar
S. Anand
Nagaraj
Murthy
Srishaila
Sringeri Sanjeeva
Sharma
Rathnakara Shetty

Soundtrack
The music was composed by M. Ranga Rao.

References

External links

1987 films
1980s Kannada-language films
Films scored by M. Ranga Rao
Films directed by R. N. Jayagopal
Kannada remakes of Tamil films